Max Schmidt (23 August 1818 – 8 January 1901) was a German landscape painter.

Biography
Schmidt was a native of Berlin, Province of Brandenburg. He studied in the Berlin Art Academy under Carl Joseph Begas and Wilhelm Schirmer. He was largely influenced in his choice of subjects and in his treatment by his familiarity with Egypt and Greece, and paid little heed to German scenes until 1854, but then treated them with rare poetic feeling.

In 1868 he became instructor at the School of Arts in Weimar, and in 1872 went to the Königsberg Academy. His chief works are the Oriental frescoes in the Berlin Museum, “Wood and Mountain” (1868) and “A View on the Spree” (1877), both in the Berlin National Gallery. He wrote Die Aquarellmalerei (Watercolor painting, 7th ed. 1901). He died in Königsberg.

Sources

External links

ArtNet: More works by Schmidt.

1818 births
1901 deaths
19th-century German painters
19th-century German male artists
German male painters
Artists from Berlin
People from the Province of Brandenburg